Schinopsis is a genus of South American trees in the family Anacardiaceae, also known by the common names quebracho, quebracho colorado and red quebracho. In Brazil it is known as baraúna or braúna.

Description
The species within this genus inhabit different regions of the Gran Chaco ecoregion including parts of northern Argentina, Bolivia, and Paraguay. In Brazil it can be found as a component of the Caatinga in the northwestern region. 

The name is in recognition of the hardness of the wood from the Spanish quiebra-hacha ("axe-breaker"). It also distinguishes the species from the "white quebracho" trees of the unrelated genus Aspidosperma. 

Schinopsis is the exclusive food plant of the moth Coleophora haywardi.

Species
 Schinopsis balansae (common name: quebracho colorado chaqueño)
 Schinopsis boqueronensis 
 Schinopsis brasiliensis 
 Schinopsis cornuta  
 Schinopsis haenkeana
 Schinopsis heterophylla (common name: Quebracho colorado mestizo)
 Schinopsis lorentzii , synonym S. quebracho-colorado (common name: quebracho colorado santiagueño)
 Schinopsis marginata 
 Schinopsis peruviana

Uses
The timber is used in furniture and on railroads due to its durability.

References

 
Anacardiaceae genera